Gene Leedy (February 6, 1928 – November 24, 2018) was an American architect based in Winter Haven, Florida. He was a pioneer of the modern movement in Florida and later a founder of the Sarasota School of Architecture, whose members included Paul Rudolph, Victor Lundy, and others. After beginning his career in Sarasota, Leedy moved his practice to Winter Haven in 1954.  He is best known for his bold use of precast concrete, especially in long-span, "double-tee" structural elements.

Personal life
Gene Leedy was born to Cecil Hudgins Leedy and Ethyl Ferguson Leedy on February 6, 1928 in Isaban, West Virginia. Cecil was a supervisor for a coal mining company, and Ethyl taught in a one-room schoolhouse. The family eventually moved to Gainesville, Florida, where Cecil opened a small restaurant. At the University of Florida in Gainesville, Gene later studied architecture. On July 20, 1950, in Arlington, Virginia, he married Kathryn "Bebe" Hoge, of Tampa, Florida. The couple settled in Florida, first in Sarasota and then, in 1954, in Winter Haven, where Gene opened his own architectural office. Their son, Robert Hoge Leedy, was born in Winter Haven on October 17, 1956, but they divorced in 1958. Gene then married Marjorie Frances Ingram on March 6, 1960, residing in Winter Haven along with Marjorie's daughter from her previous marriage, Helen Isabel King (born August 27, 1954). The family grew with the birth of their daughter, Marjorie "Saffie" Leedy, on October 25, 1962, and their son, Gene Ingram Leedy, on November 1, 1969. Leedy's wife, Marjorie, died on Christmas Day 2010 in Winter Haven.

Notable career achievements
Leedy was selected as one of Architectural Record'''s successful young architects in 1965 with a published portfolio of his work. In 1988, he was awarded the lifetime design achievement award from the Florida Association of Architects.  He was inducted into the College of Fellows of the American Institute of Architects in 1992, and received the outstanding alumni award from the College of Architecture of the University of Florida in 1993. His work has been extensively published in the U.S. and Europe and has received more than 50 architectural awards both nationally and statewide.

In addition to projects throughout the U.S., including Hawaii, he designed a large housing complex for the government of Malaysia. He was also a design consultant for Alfred A. Yee and Associates, Architects and Engineers, Honolulu, Hawaii for more than 25 years. Among Leedy's notable former employees are architects Lawrence Scarpa and Max Strang, whose firm Strang Design, collaborated with Alive Coverage on The Gene Leedy Influence''. This short film is about a house designed by Gene Leedy in 1956 in Winter Haven, Florida, which was his own family residence, as well as the original prototype for the Craney Spec Homes development.  This small collection of homes is now recognized as a National Historic District.

Honors and awards
Lifetime Design Achievement Award - Florida Chapter of the American Institute of Architects - 1988
Outstanding Alumni Award - University of Florida College of Architecture - 1993
Fellows of the AIA - 1992

Significant works

Commercial projects
 Cypress Gardens Bank, Winter Haven, Florida, 1965
 City Hall, Winter Haven, Florida, 1960
 Gene Leedy Architectural Office, Winter Haven, Florida, 1961
 Keiltronix Office Building, Charlotte, North Carolina, 1987
 Taxdal Medical Center, Winter Haven, Florida, 1986
 Flagship Bank, Orlando, Florida, 1975
 Chamber of Commerce, Winter Haven, Florida, 1990
 Walden Lake Country Club, Plant City, Florida 1985
 Commerce Bank of Central Florida, Winter Haven, Florida 1990
 American National Bank, Winter Haven, Florida, 1962
 Brentwood Elementary School, Sarasota, Florida, 1958
 First National Bank of Cape Canaveral, Cape Canaveral, FL 1963

Residential projects
 House for Contemporary Builders, Sarasota, Florida, 1950
 Craney Homes, Inc, Winter Haven, Florida, 1956
 Weaving/Thomasson house, Winter Haven, Florida, 1956
 Navickas Residence, Winter Haven, Florida, 1957
 Dormon Residence, Winter Haven, Florida, 1963
 Builder's House for Levitt & Sons Inc, Rockledge, Florida, 1964
 Libby Residence, Winter Park, Florida, 1957
 Sands Residence, Winter Haven, Florida, 1965
 S.A.E. Fraternity House, University of Florida, Gainesville, Florida, 1963
 Sparrow Residence, Winter Haven, Florida, 1954
 Azalea Place Townhouses, Winter Park, Florida, 1982
 Brogden Residence, Winter Haven, Florida, 1979
 Miller Residence, Plant City, Florida, 1985
 Carlton Beach House, Boca Grande, Florida, 1985
 Dean Residence, Winter Haven, Florida 1983
 De Pree Residence, Marco Island, Florida 1979
 Garcia Residence, Anna Maria Island, Florida, 1995
 Keilhack Residence, Charlotte, North Carolina, 1979
 Leedy Residence, Winter Haven, Florida, 1956 (Addition in 1998)
 Leedy Beach House, Casey Key, Florida, 1985 (Renovation)
 Lifsey President's House, University of South Florida, Tampa, Florida 1994
 Smith Beach House, Boca Grande, Florida, 1985
 Solomon Residence & Studio, Siesta Key, Florida, 1970
 Strang Residence, Winter Haven, Florida, 1970
 Strasberg Residence, Longwood, Florida, 1982

References

 Hochstim, Jan. "Florida Modern." Rizzoli International Publications, 2005.
 Howey, John. "The Sarasota School of Architecture." The MIT Press, 1995.
 Weaving, Andrew. Sarasota Modern. Rizzoli, 2006.

External links
 The Leedy Lifetime Works Tour
 Sarasota Historical Resources
 Lakeland Ledger Profile

1928 births
2018 deaths
Architects from Florida
Modernist architects
University of Florida alumni
Modernist architecture in Florida
People from Winter Haven, Florida